The 2018 Honkbal Hoofdklasse season began Thursday, April 26.

Standings

References

Honkbal Hoofdklasse
2018 in baseball